Nawang Sherpa became the first person to climb Mount Everest with a prosthetic leg by reaching the summit on May 16, 2004 (see Mount Everest Timeline and Trivia). He is also the first amputee to reach the summit of Mount Everest on his first attempt, and the first disabled person from Asia to stand on the summit.

Nawang, a trans-tibial amputee, is a native of Tapting in the Himalayan region of Solukhumbu in Nepal. He grew up with a love of mountains and a dream to climb Mount Everest some day. He had completed part of his training to become a high altitude Sherpa guide when he was injured in a traffic accident in Kathmandu in 2000. Despite months of hospitalization, his left leg required amputation, ending his climbing career and dream to climb Everest. A group of Nawang's American friends responded to his plight, and arranged for him to fly to California where he received a donation of his first sturdy prosthetic leg from the Orthopaedic Surgery Department of the University of California San Francisco (UCSF) in May 2001. He had arrived from Nepal on tattered crutches; a month later he returned walking strongly on two legs.

In the spring of 2002, he met the famous double amputee and high-altitude mountaineer/airline pilot Ed Hommer of Minnesota in Kathmandu as Ed returned from an attempt to climb of Mount Everest. They became friends and Ed invited Nawang to join him on his next Everest expedition which was planned for 2003. Unfortunately, Ed Hommer was killed by rockfall while training on Mount Rainier in the autumn of 2002. However, in 2004 Nawang's friend Tom McMillan of the San Francisco Bay Area received an opportunity to climb Mount Everest and immediately invited Nawang to climb with him as his climbing partner. This was the genesis of their very successful 2004 Friendship Beyond Borders Expedition.

The High Exposure Foundation, established in the 1990s in Minnesota by Ed Hommer, offered to help Nawang achieve his Everest dream with donations of high-tech prosthetic equipment suitable for mountain climbing and trekking. Ed Hommer's prosthetist, Tom Halvorson, oversaw Nawang's fittings and coached him on how to hike and climb at extreme altitudes safely. This enabled Nawang to successfully trek across the high Himalayan Khumbu region of Nepal for days to reach Everest basecamp, climb steep snow and ice slopes during the many weeks of acclimatization ascents partially up the mountain and back, then make the final continuous push to the summit and back during a perfect "weather window" on the mountain. Each day he had to carry—in addition to his food, water, extra clothes, and other supplies—a spare prosthetic leg in case of problems. Another extraordinary aspect of his accomplishment is that Nawang chose not to do any physical training before the expedition, as he was concerned about possibly damaging his knee or prosthetic leg. In addition, nausea during his summit push prevented him from eating during the three-day climb up to the summit and the two-day descent back to basecamp.

During the April 2006 Friendship Beyond Borders expedition, Nawang made a partial ascent of the sixth highest peak in the world, Cho Oyu, on the Nepal-Tibet border about 12 miles from Mount Everest. For that climb, Nawang and the team were assisted by Nawang's younger brother Ang Dawa Sherpa and friend Nima Gombu Sherpa. Record snowfall amounts and logistical problems prevented the team from reaching the summit that year.

Nawang has received many honors for his achievement, including the Everest Award from the Nepal Mountaineering Association and the prestigious Suprabal Gorakha Dakshin Bahu (Third) Gold Medal from His Majesty the King of Nepal.

See also
Mount Everest Timeline and Trivia
Timeline of climbing Mount Everest

References
 
 

Year of birth missing (living people)
Living people
Nepalese Buddhists
People from Solukhumbu District
Sherpa summiters of Mount Everest
Nepalese summiters of Mount Everest

Nepalese mountain climbers
Nepalese amputees
Nepalese people with disabilities